Nicholas Dexter Benjamin (May 29, 1961 – August 20, 2007) was a professional football player. Benjamin was an offensive lineman with the Ottawa Rough Riders and Winnipeg Blue Bombers from 1985 to 1993.

Collegiate career
Nick Benjamin played for Concordia Stingers of Concordia University in Montreal, Quebec. He was twice named an All-Canadian and conference all-star. After his career he was inducted into the Concordia University Sports Hall of Fame.

CFL career
Benjamin played with the Ottawa Rough Riders from 1985 to 1989 before joining the Winnipeg Blue Bombers in 1989. He retired after completing the 1993 season.

Post CFL Career
After his football career, he remained active in the Winnipeg community. He was diagnosed with kidney disease. The disease would eventually take his life in 2007 at the age of 46.

External links
Bombers mourn passing of Benjamin
CBC - Former CFLer Nick Benjamin dead at 46

1961 births
2007 deaths
Ottawa Rough Riders players
Trinidad and Tobago emigrants to Canada
Winnipeg Blue Bombers players
Canadian football offensive linemen
Concordia Stingers football players
Canadian Football League Rookie of the Year Award winners
Players of Canadian football from Manitoba
Canadian football people from Winnipeg